Yu Mao-Hong (b. 1934) is a Chinese engineer and a university professor. He is noted for his research on the strength hypotheses and yield surfaces of isotropic materials. His unified strength theory (UST) has found acceptance as generalized classical strength theory. It contains the following nonparametric strength theories and criteria:
 the normal stress theory (the William John Macquorn Rankine hypothesis),
 the Tresca yield criterion,
 the von Mises yield criterion (the Sokolovsky regular  dodecagon in the π-plane), and
 the Schmidt-Ishlinsky yield criterion
and three one-parameter criteria: 
the Mohr–Coulomb theory (Single-Shear-Theory (SST)), the Sdobyrev (Pisarenko-Lebedev) criterion, and the Twin-Shear-Theory (TST). The Unified Yield Criterion (UYC) as a part of the UST is used in the theory of plasticity (physics).

Curriculum vitae 
 1951–1955 student at Zhejiang University, Hangzhou 
 1955–1959 assistant at Zhejiang University, Hangzhou 
 1960–1966 lecturer at Xi'an Jiaotong University, Xi'an
 1978–1980 lecturer at Xi'an Jiaotong University, Xi'an
 1981–1984 associate professor at Xi'an Jiaotong University, Xi'an
 1985 till now professor at Xi'an Jiaotong University, Xi'an

Selected books 
 Introduction to Unified Strength Theory. Mao-Hong Yu, Shu-Qi Yu, CRC Press, London, 2019, 
 Unified Strength Theory and Its Applications, Second Edition. Mao-Hong Yu, Springer, Singapore, 2017, 
 Computational Plasticity: With Emphasis on the Application of the Unified Strength Theory (Advanced Topics in Science and Technology in China). Mao-Hong Yu, Jian-Chun Li, Springer, Berlin, 2012, 
 Generalized Plasticity. Mao-Hong Yu, Guo-Wei Ma, Hong-Fu Qiang, Yong-Qiang Zhang, Springer, Berlin, 2010, 
 Structural Plasticity: Limit, Shakedown and Dynamic Plastic Analyses of Structures (Advanced Topics in Science and Technology in China). Mao-Hong Yu, Guo-Wei Ma, Jian-Chun Li, Springer, Berlin, 2009, 
 Generalized Plasticity. Mao-Hong Yu, Guo-Wei Ma, Hong-Fu Qiang, Yong-Qiang Zhang, Springer, Berlin, 2006, ; 978-3-540-25127-9
 Unified Strength Theory and Its Applications. Mao-Hong Yu, Springer, Berlin, 2004, 
 Computational Plasticity (in Chinese). Mao-Hong Yu, Li Jian Chun, Springer, Berlin, 2000
 Engineering Strength Theory (in Chinese). Mao-Hong Yu, Higher Education Pressress, Beijing, 1999
 Researches on the Twin Shear Stress Strength Theory (in Chinese). Mao-Hong Yu, Xi'an Jiaotong University Press, Xi'an, 1988

Selected articles  
 General behaviour of isotropic yield function (in Chinese: 各向同性屈服函数的一般性貭 - 俞茂鋐. Mao-Hong Yu, Scientific and Technological Research Paper of Xi'an Jiaotong University, Xi'an, 1961, pp. 1–11
 Brittle fracture and plastic yield criterion (in Chinese: 各向同性屈服函数的一般性貭 (双切屈服准則及其流动規律). Mao-Hong Yu, Scientific and Technological Research Paper of Xi'an Jiaotong University, Xi'an, 1962, pp. 1–25
 Twin shear stress yield criterion. Mao-Hong Yu, Int. J. Mech. Sci., 1(25), 1983, pp. 71–74
 Advances in strength theories for materials under complex stress state in the 20th century. Mao-Hong Yu, Applied Mechanics Reviews, 5(55), 2002, pp. 169–218
 Linear and non-linear Unified Strength Theory (in Chinese). Mao-Hong Yu, Journal of Geotechnical Engineering, 4(26), 2007, pp. 662–669
 Basic characteristics and development of yield criteria for geomaterials. Mao-Hong Yu, Xia, G., Kolupaev, V. A., Journal of Rock Mechanics and Geotechnical Engineering, 1(1), 2009, pp. 71–88, 
 Unified Strength Theory (UST). Mao-Hong Yu, Rock Mechanics and Engineering, Volume 1: Principles, Editor: Xia-Ting Feng, pp. 425–450, CRC Press, London, 2017,

Awards  
 2011: National Natural Science Award, China
 2014: Excellent Article Award, Journal of Rock mechanics and Geotechnical Engineering
 2015: Ho Leung Ho Lee Foundation Price, China

References 

Living people
1934 births
Chinese engineers
Zhejiang University alumni